The 17th Operational Weather Squadron (17 OWS) is a unit of the military of the United States. Based at Hickam Air Force Base in Hawaii, it covers weather for the largest geographical area in the world.

Mission
The 17th Operational Weather Squadron is responsible for producing and disseminating mission planning and execution weather analyses, forecasts, and briefings for Air Force, Army, Navy, Marines, Guard, Reserve, USFK, PACOM, PACAF, USARPAC, SOCPAC, and NAVPAC forces operating at 115 installations/sites over 110M sq.mi. within the Pacific theater of operations.

This weather squadron is responsible for base or post forecasting, developing weather products, briefing transient aircrews, and weather warnings for all of their geographical units. The current commander of the 17th Operational Weather Squadron is Lt Col Claire Jarry.  Using automatic observing systems located at all military installations and communicating with their combat weather flights, the squadron is able to 'watch' the weather in their entire area of responsibility from one central location.

The Operational Weather Squadron is likely the first place a newly schooled weather apprentice will report. At the squadron, working alongside a seasoned weather professional, the forecaster is trained in all aspects of Air Force meteorology, from pilot briefing to tactical forecasting.

Personnel and resources
17th Operational Weather Squadron's manning consists of active duty, reserve, civilian and contract personnel and is located on Hickam Air Force Base, Hawaii.

Lineage
Activations and Inactivations of the 17th Weather Squadron, and the 17th Operational Weather Squadron.
Constituted 17th Weather Squadron (Regional Control) on 31 Aug 1942
Activated on 18 Sep 1942
Disbanded on 10 Feb 1945
Reconstituted and redesignated 17th Weather Squadron, on 24 Jul 1969
Activated on 15 Jan 1970
Inactivated on 30 Jun 1972
Activated on 1 Apr 1980
Inactivated on 30 Sep 1991
Redesignated 17th Operational Weather Squadron on 12 Oct 2000
Activated on 27 Oct 2000.

Duty Assignments
List of duty assignments and parent units from 1942 to present.
McClellan Field, California, Army Air Forces, 18 September 1942 – 26 October 1942
Auckland, New Zealand, Army Air Forces, 26 October 1942 – 17 January 1943
Noumea, New Caledonia, United States Army Forces in the South Pacific Area, 20 January 1943 – 1 July 1943
Noumea, New Caledonia, 13th Air Force, 1 July 1943 – 20 December 1943
Noumea, New Caledonia, United States Army Forces in the South Pacific Area, 20 December 1943 – 1 August 1944
Noumea, New Caledonia, Army Air Forces, Pacific Ocean Area, 1 August 1944 – 4 September 1944
Noumea, New Caledonia, 1st Provisional Weather Group, 4 September 1944 – 29 November 1944
Hickam Field, Territory of Hawaii, 1st Provisional Weather Group 29 November 1944 - 10 February 1945
Travis Air Force Base, California, 7th Weather Wing, 15 January 1970 – 30 June 1972
Travis Air Force Base, California, 7th Weather Wing, 1 April 1980 – 30 September 1991
Hickam Air Force Base, Hawaii, 502nd Air Operations Group, 27 October 2000 – present

Emblem
Approved on 9 Jun 1982.

Blazon: The four stars and the blue background represent the Southern Cross constellation and the midnight, as observed in the area where the squadron is stationed. The red lightning flash against the yellow sky denotes the sudden tropical storms common to the region. The white anemometer, the universal symbol of weather forecasting, depicts the squadron's function.

History
The 17th Operational Weather Squadron was activated as the 17th Weather Squadron on September 18, 1942, at McClellan Field, California.

The squadron shortly thereafter relocated to Auckland, New Zealand, where it was assigned to U.S. Army Forces in the South Pacific Area. In January 1943 the 17th relocated to Noumea, New Caledonia. It was reassigned to Thirteenth Air Force on July 1, 1943, but returned to the control of U.S. Army Forces in the South Pacific Area on December 20, 1943.

The squadron was assigned to Army Air Forces, Pacific Ocean Area on August 1, 1944, but reassigned to the 1st Provisional Weather Group on September 4. In November 1944, the 17th moved to Hickam Field, Hawaii, where it was disbanded on February 10, 1945.

The 17th was again activated on January 15, 1970, at Travis Air Force Base, California, as part of the 7th Weather Wing. It was inactivated on June 30, 1972. The squadron was activated once again on April 1, 1980, at Travis. It was inactivated on September 30, 1991, as part of the divestiture of Air Weather Service.
The 17th was redesignated the 17th Operational Weather Squadron on October 12, 2000, and activated on October 27, 2000, at Hickam, where it was assigned to the 502nd Air Operations Group. The 17th began operating alongside the Navy (Joint Typhoon Warning Center Detachment) in March 2010.

Awards
Service Streamers. World War II Asiatic-Pacific Theater.

See also
List of United States Air Force weather squadrons

External links
 17OWS Article
 17OWS History
 17OWS Factsheet

Weather 017